Al-Nafs al-Zakiyyah, according to Shia Islamic eschatology, is one of the apocalyptic characters that Mahdi will send as his envoy to Mecca before his reappearance which will end the Major Occultation. He will be killed in Mecca and his death is one of the signs of the Mahdi in Shia Islam.

Appellation
Nafs-e-Zakiyyah is a person by the name of Muhammad ibn al-Hasan. He is a descendant of Husayn ibn Ali. He is named Nafse-e-Zakiyyah because he is very pious and devout and another reason for his nickname is that he will be slain without any sin and crime.

Duty of Nafs-e-Zakiyyah
The duty of Nafs-e-Zakiyyah is mentioned in a hadith that was narrated by Abu-Basir from Muhammad al-Baqir. According to the hadith, when Muhammad al-Mahdi realizes, the people of Mecca won't accept his reappearance. Therefore, he will send Nafs-e-Zakiyyah as an envoy to convey his oral message to people of Mecca.

Certain sign of reappearance
According to narrations, the murder of Nafs-e-Zakiyyah is one of the certain signs of reappearance of Muhammad al-Mahdi. The hadith of Ja'far al-Sadiq mentions these signs: "there are five signs for our Dhuhur (the reappearance of the twelfth Imam), the appearance of Sufyani and Yamani, the loud cry in the sky, the martyr of Nafs-e-Zakiyyah, and the earth swallowing (a group of people) in the land of Beyda."

Place and time of murder
He will be slain by the people of Mecca around the Ka'ba after imparting the Imam's message to them. Ibn Babawayh in his work mentions a hadith of Ja'far al-Sadiq that says the uprising of Muhammad al-Mahdi will occur 15 days after the murder of Nafse Zakkeyah.

According to Shia beliefs, Nafs-e-Zakiyyah is a sign that will occur before Muhammad al-Mahdi's appearance, who will be killed between Rukn and Maqame Ibrahim (Position of Ibrahim) in the ambit of Ka’ba. Al-Irshad contains biographies of each of the fourteen infallibles and says the reappearance of Muhammad al-Mahdi will occur at an interval of 15 days after this event.

See also

 Muhammad al-Nafs al-Zakiyya
 Reappearance of Muhammad al-Mahdi
 Signs of the reappearance of Muhammad al-Mahdi

References 

Shia eschatology
Shia imams
Islamic terminology
Mahdism